BD-12 may refer to:
Bede BD-12, an American aircraft design
Chuadanga District, a Western district of Bangladesh